Roligan is a nickname for a supporter of the Danish national football team. Roligans are noted for being the opposite of ultras, i.e. calm, quiet, well-mannered supporters of their team who shun unsportsmanlike behavior or violence. This behavior is the exact opposite of that exhibited by hooligans. The term roligan is a portmanteau of rolig (Danish for calm) and hooligan.

History 
The term "Roligan" was invented by the editors of the Danish newspaper B.T. in 1985, and later included in the Danish dictionary.

The movement was founded during the successful years of Danish football in the 1980s. The Danish roligans' colorful and convivial behavior in connection with international matches through the 1980s resulted in the UNESCO Fair Play Trophy in 1984 being awarded to the "Danish Supporters at the European Championship in France".

See also  
 Denmark national football team
 Tartan Army, the supporters of the Scotland national team who are equally renowned for their peaceful nature.

References

External links
 Danish Football factsheet (11.9 MB PDF file) published by the Ministry of Foreign Affairs of Denmark
 List of Fair Play Winners, 1984
 De Danske Roligans (national team fan club) 

Association football supporters' associations
Denmark national football team